Jarmo Kuusisto (born April 5, 1961) is a Finnish former professional ice hockey defenceman.

Kuusisto played a total of 714 games in the SM-Liiga, 696 games for Lukko and 18 for Ässät. In the 1990–91 SM-liiga season, he won the Juha Rantasila Trophy for scoring the most goals by a defenceman with 16.

He also played in France's Élite Ligue for Brest Albatros Hockey and Drakkars de Caen, Sweden's Elitserien for AIK IF and Denmark's Codan Ligan for the Herning Blue Fox.

Kuusisto played for the Finland national team in the 1987, 1989 and 1990 Ice Hockey World Championships.

References

External links

1961 births
Living people
AIK IF players
Ässät players
Brest Albatros Hockey players
Drakkars de Caen players
Herning Blue Fox players
Lukko players
Finnish ice hockey defencemen
People from Uusikaupunki
Sportspeople from Southwest Finland